The Scarborough House Archaeological Site in Accomack County, Virginia, is believed to be the location of the estate house of Edmund Scarborough, the Eastern Shore's largest landowner in the 17th century.  Called Occohannock House for its location on the creek of the same name, the site is now buried in a silted-over cove called Scarborough Gut.  Virginia state archaeologists have mapped the extent and integrity of the site.

The site was listed on the National Register of Historic Places in 1985.

See also
National Register of Historic Places listings in Accomack County, Virginia

References

Archaeological sites on the National Register of Historic Places in Virginia
National Register of Historic Places in Accomack County, Virginia